Sir Charles Lister Ryan  (30 September 1831 – 20 November 1920) was a British civil servant. He served as Comptroller and Auditor-General of the Exchequer from 1888 until his retirement in 1896.

Life
He was born in St John's, Worcester, the son of barrister Sir Edward Ryan and Louisa Whitmore.

Ryan was a Clerk in the Treasury (1851–65), also serving as private secretary to Benjamin Disraeli (1858), Sir Stafford Northcote (1859), and William Ewart Gladstone when he was Chancellor of the Exchequer (1859–65). He was appointed secretary to the Board of Audit in 1865. He served as Assistant-Comptroller and Auditor (1873-88), followed by Comptroller and Auditor of the Exchequer and Audit Department (1888–96). He was also a governor of Wellington College, Berkshire.

He was appointed a Companion of the Order of the Bath in the 1881 Birthday Honours and knighted in the same order in the 1887 Golden Jubilee Honours.

Family
In 1862, Ryan married Jane Georgiana, daughter of Sir John Shaw Lefevre. Their daughter Madeleine Harriet Dagmar married Arthur Elliot in 1888.

References  

1831 births
1920 deaths
19th-century British civil servants
Knights Commander of the Order of the Bath
People from St John's, Worcester
English justices of the peace
Civil servants in the Exchequer and Audit Department